Yun Young-sun (born 4 October 1988) is a South Korean footballer who plays as centre back for Jeonbuk Hyundai Motors and the South Korea national football team.

Club career
Yun was drafted in the 2010 K-League Draft by Seongnam Ilhwa Chunma. On 9 March 2010, Yun made his professional debut AFC Champions League against Melbourne Victory, scoring Seongnam's second goal in away won 2–0. Yun made his K-League debut on 19 March away against Jeonbuk Hyundai Motors, coming on as substitute for Kim Jin-yong in the 72nd minutes. He was linked with Chinese Super League side Henan Jianye in January 2014, however, his transfer was blocked after failing to pass the physical examination.

Club career statistics
As of 5 December 2021

1Includes League Cup and Playoffs.

International career
In May 2018 he was named in South Korea's preliminary 28 man squad for the 2018 FIFA World Cup in Russia.

Honors

Club
Seongnam Ilhwa Chunma / Seongnam FC
AFC Champions League: 2010
FA Cup: 2011, 2014

International
South Korea
EAFF East Asian Cup: 2017

References

External links
 Yun Young-sun – National Team Stats at KFA 

1988 births
Living people
Association football central defenders
South Korean footballers
Seongnam FC players
Gimcheon Sangmu FC players
Ulsan Hyundai FC players
FC Seoul players
K League 1 players
K League 2 players
South Korea international footballers
2018 FIFA World Cup players